Acanthanectes is a genus of triplefins in the family Tripterygiidae. It contains two described species at present.

Species
 Acanthanectes hystrix Holleman & Buxton, 1993
 Acanthanectes rufus Holleman & Buxton, 1993

References

 
Tripterygiidae